This is the discography documenting albums and singles released by American funk/R&B singer/musician Rick James.

Albums

Studio albums

Compilation albums

Albums credited to The Stone City Band

Albums recorded as sideman
 Bruce Palmer – The Cycle Is Complete (1970) (vocals and percussion)

Singles

Writing and production discography

Albums

Singles

References

Discographies of American artists
Rhythm and blues discographies
Soul music discographies
Disco discographies